John W. (Jack) Rogers is an American businessman who is the retired chairman of the board and chief executive officer of United Parcel Service, a position he held from May 1984 to November 1989.

Early life and education
Rogers graduated from Miami University (OH) in 1957 with a bachelor's degree in business administration. While at Miami, he became a brother of Delta Upsilon Fraternity.

Career
After graduating from Miami, Rogers started with UPS as a trainee in Cincinnati loading and delivering packages.  He would eventually move into business roles, such as industrial engineering, personnel, and hub and delivery operations, before being promoted to division manager in Chicago.

Rogers continued to rise through the UPS ranks holding a number of management positions throughout the United States leading up to being appointed the national operations manager in January 1978 and being elected to the board of directors in 1979.  Five years later, Jack became the chairman and chief executive officer in 1984.

The key highlight of his tenure was the start of international air service between the United States and six European countries in 1985.

Rogers stepped down as chairman in November 1989 and retired from active employment at the end of the year. He continued to serve as a director for an additional six years.

References

Miami University alumni
Living people
Date of birth missing (living people)
20th-century American businesspeople
Year of birth missing (living people)